The Dennis Lance was a single-decker bus chassis manufactured by Dennis between 1991 and 2000, replacing the Dennis Falcon. Its low floor variant, the Dennis Lance SLF (Super Low Floor) was built between 1993 and 1996. Between 1995 and 1998, Dennis also built its double-deck variant, the Dennis Arrow (initially marketed as double-deck Dennis Lance), as the replacement of the Dennis Dominator.

History
The Dennis Lance was unveiled at the 1991 Coach & Bus Show.

The Dennis Lance was available with a number of bodies, most commonly the Alexander PS and Plaxton Verde also 31 with Northern Counties, were built for Metroline in 1993 for routes 113 and 302 from Cricklewood garage. It was sold to a number of bus operators in the United Kingdom, and was also exported to Hong Kong, Malaysia, New Zealand and Singapore. UMW-Dennis of Malaysia also built a number of Lance chassis (known as the UMW-Dennis Lance) for the Southeast Asian market.

In 1993, the low floor Dennis Lance SLF was unveiled. Of around 105 Dennis Lance SLF built, the majority had Wright Pathfinder bodywork, including 38 for London Buses for use on the first London routes to be converted to low floor including London United's route 120 and CentreWest's route 222, being two of five routes to introduce the type to the capital.

The Berkhof Excellence 1000 NL bodywork was fitted to 30 dual purpose specialist vehicles for the British Airports Authority for use on staff shuttle duties at Heathrow Airport, delivered in 1994/95, and also five each for Stagecoach East Kent and Stagecoach Ribble.

In Hong Kong, Kowloon Motor Bus had 24 units with Alexander PS bodywork and they were retired by 2010.

In Malaysia,   Triton Commuter used to operate a fleet of UMW-Dennis Lance with Duple Metsec bodywork where previously purchased and used by Naeila Corps before the company was bought over by Causeway Link. Some of the buses continued service with Causeway Link, while others were sold to 707 Travel Group. Transit Link JB also operated a small number of UMW-Dennis Lance with Duple Metsec bodywork.

In New Zealand, Ritchies Coachlines operate a UMW-Dennis Lance with Duple Metsec bodywork.

In Singapore, Trans-Island Bus Services ordered 72 units, of which 52 were built by UMW-Dennis. Most were fitted with Duple Metsec bodywork, while the last 2 were fitted with Volgren bodywork. 59 units were allocated for public service and 13 units for charter under subsidiary company Bus-Plus Services. All public service buses were scrapped by July 2013, while the charter buses were scrapped by October 2018.

Not many survive today, in fact there are only 13 known in preservation within the UK.

The double-deck Dennis Arrow was available with Northern Counties Palatine and East Lancs E Type/Pyoneer bodywork. It was sold to just five operators in the United Kingdom, including Capital Citybus who bought 54 of the 73 built (the total number also included two purpose-built playbuses), London & Country who took ten and Nottingham City Transport who took four. The Dennis Arrow was superseded by the low-floor Dennis Trident 2.

References

External links
 
 Flickr gallery

Lance
Vehicles introduced in 1991
Bus chassis
Low-floor buses
Step-entrance buses